Jackson Ryan Wood (born August 7, 2000) is an American professional stock car racing driver. He competes part-time in the NASCAR Craftsman Truck Series, driving the No. 51 Chevrolet Silverado for Kyle Busch Motorsports and part-time in the ARCA Menards Series, driving the No. 6 Chevrolet SS for Rev Racing. He has previously raced in the ARCA Menards Series, and also in the ARCA Menards Series East and West.

Racing career

Wood competed part-time in the NASCAR K&N Pro Series East in 2019 and again in 2020 when the series became the ARCA Menards Series West after NASCAR's merger with ARCA. Driving for his family-owned team, Velocity Racing, Wood collectively scored eight top-10's and one top 5 in those two years in his No. 78 car.

On November 2, 2020, it was announced that Wood would be joining GMS Racing in 2021 to compete full-time in the ARCA Menards Series East as well as all the Sioux Chief Showdown races in the main ARCA Menards Series, replacing 2019 and 2020 East Series champion Sam Mayer in the team's No. 21 car. This would also mean that he would also become a member of the team's driver development program, Drivers Edge Development. However, these plans quietly changed, as Wood and his GMS No. 21 were entered for the first two races on the main ARCA Menards Series schedule (which they were not originally scheduled to enter), and they skipped the second race of the East Series schedule, which indicated that they would instead run full-time in the main ARCA Menards Series rather than the East Series.

On May 13, 2021, it was announced that Wood would make his NASCAR Camping World Truck Series debut for GMS in the team's No. 24 truck at Circuit of the Americas and would also run the next week's race at Charlotte. The opportunity came after the full-time driver of the No. 24, Raphaël Lessard, could no longer run a full season in that truck due to lack of funding.

Wood and his No. 21 car ended up skipping the main ARCA Menards Series race at Toledo (he was at COTA on the same day for the Truck Series race), which meant that they no longer were attempting the full season.

On June 10, 2021, GMS announced Wood would pilot the No. 24 truck for the remainder of the 2021 season (Doug Coby drove at Bristol). He would remain with the team for the full 2022 slate.

Wood is due to drive part-time in the No. 51 Chevrolet for Kyle Busch Motorsports for 2023.

Motorsports career results

NASCAR
(key) (Bold – Pole position awarded by qualifying time. Italics – Pole position earned by points standings or practice time. * – Most laps led.)

Craftsman Truck Series

 Season still in progress
 Ineligible for series points

ARCA Menards Series
(key) (Bold – Pole position awarded by qualifying time. Italics – Pole position earned by points standings or practice time. * – Most laps led.)

ARCA Menards Series East

ARCA Menards Series West

References

External links
 
 Official profile at Kyle Busch Motorsports
 

Living people
2000 births
Racing drivers from California
People from Loomis, California
NASCAR drivers
ARCA Menards Series drivers